Daniel John  Orlovsky  (born August 18, 1983) is an American football analyst for ESPN and former American football quarterback who was active for twelve seasons in the National Football League (NFL). He was drafted by the Detroit Lions in the fifth round of the 2005 NFL Draft. He played college football at the University of Connecticut. As a junior his 33 passing touchdowns ranked 7th in NCAA Division 1-A. Orlovsky also played for the Houston Texans, Indianapolis Colts, Tampa Bay Buccaneers, and Los Angeles Rams.

Early years
Born in Bridgeport, Connecticut, Orlovsky played high school football. "When I was younger, I would have garbage cans set up all around the yard," Orlovsky recalled. "And I would have like 20 balls and just fire them into the cans. I really had nothing else to do back then."

Orlovsky attended Shelton High School and became the starting quarterback during his sophomore year.  As a senior, he threw for 2,489 yards and 58 touchdowns as the Gaels went 12–0, winning a state championship. His overall record as a high school quarterback was 28–4. He earned All-American honors from Prep Football Report, SuperPrep and Prep Star, and was also named Connecticut all-state, Class LL MVP, the New Haven Register's Connecticut Player of the Year and winner of the McHugh Award. 

Despite offers from Purdue and Michigan State, Orlovsky committed to play at Connecticut, where he wanted the challenge of elevating the Huskies into a Big East contender.

College career

2001 
Orlovsky became the starter at Connecticut during his freshman year when Keron Henry suffered a sprained knee. Orlovsky threw for 1,379 yards and nine touchdowns on 128 of 269 passing (47.6 percent) while being intercepted 11 times.

2002 
Starting every game as a sophomore, Orlovsky hit on 221 of 366 attempts (60.4 percent), with 19 touchdowns and 11 interceptions. His 2,488 yards passing rank fourth on the school's season-record list.

2003 
As a junior, he ranked seventh in the nation in passing, hitting on 279 of 475 passes (58.7 percent) for 3,485 yards, 33 touchdowns and 14 interceptions. His 33 scoring tosses ranked first in the NCAA Division I-A.

2004 
Orlovsky did not match his 2003 figures as a senior, but guided the team to victory in its inaugural bowl appearance. He gained 3,354 yards with 23 touchdowns and 15 interceptions on 288 of 456 throws (63.0 percent) in 2004.

Orlovsky holds the school record for most pass completions (916), pass attempts (1,567), yards passing (10,706), touchdown passes (84), interceptions (51), total plays (1,710) and total yards (10,421).

Orlovsky, along with head coach Randy Edsall, served as the "face" of the UConn football program durings the early 2000s.

Professional career

Detroit Lions
Orlovsky was selected during the 5th round of the 2005 NFL Draft, 145th overall by the Detroit Lions. When Jeff Garcia went down with an injury in the '05 preseason, Orlovsky emerged as the Lions' primary backup. He played in two regular season contests in 2005, including the nationally televised Thanksgiving Day game against the Atlanta Falcons. In the two contests combined, Orlovsky completed 7-of-17 passes for 63 yards, with no touchdowns or interceptions.

Prior to the 2006 season the Lions traded Joey Harrington and released Jeff Garcia, while signing Jon Kitna and Josh McCown. Orlovsky spent the 2006 season as the third-string QB. Orlovsky was projected to be the second-string quarterback in 2007 because Drew Stanton, who was picked in the second round of the 2007 NFL Draft, was placed on injured reserve; however, the Lions acquired J. T. O'Sullivan, who bumped Orlovsky back to third on the depth chart. Orlovsky did not take a regular season snap in either 2006 or 2007; in 2008, O'Sullivan went to the San Francisco 49ers and emerged as the starting QB there.

On September 15 against the Green Bay Packers, he finished the game, completing two of four attempts for six yards.

Orlovsky made his first career NFL start on October 12, 2008, in a 12–10 Lions loss against the Minnesota Vikings. He completed 12 of 21 passes for 150 yards, with one touchdown and no turnovers.  However, early in the first quarter when he lined up in shotgun formation, he inadvertently ran out of the back of his own end zone for a safety, in what turned out to be the margin of victory.  "When they started blowing the whistle, I was like, 'Did we false start, or were they offsides or something?'" Orlovsky said. "And I looked, and I was just like, 'You're an idiot'".

In the following week of the Lions' winless season, Orlovsky connected with Calvin Johnson on a 96-yard touchdown pass.

Orlovsky also started in the final game of the 2008 season, but was unable to lead his team to their first victory of the season. Orlovsky announced his intention to explore the free agent market at the end of the 2008 season rather than accept a contract as a backup quarterback in Detroit.

Houston Texans

He signed with the Houston Texans for a 3-year, $9 million deal on March 1, 2009. He was beaten out by Rex Grossman for the backup quarterback position during the preseason, and served as the Texans number three quarterback.  After the 2009 season, Grossman signed a one-year contract with the Washington Redskins, making Orlovsky the backup quarterback for the Texans.

Indianapolis Colts
He signed with the Indianapolis Colts as a free agent on July 30, 2011. He was one of the final cuts as NFL teams trimmed their rosters to 53. The Colts later re-signed Orlovsky on September 27, 2011. He was named the starter over the benched Curtis Painter on November 30, 2011. The next week, Orlovsky went on to complete 30 of 37 passes, with 353 yards, 2 touchdowns, and 1 interception, for a total passer rating of 113.1 in his first start as a Colt against the New England Patriots, in a 31–24 loss.

On December 18, 2011, Orlovsky and the Colts won their first game of the season (after starting 0–13) against the Titans. This was Orlovsky's first official win as a starter in the NFL. On December 22, 2011, Orlovsky led the Colts on a 12-play, 78-yard drive in a comeback victory over the 10–4 Houston Texans with less than two minutes remaining in the game.

Tampa Bay Buccaneers
On March 15, 2012, the Tampa Bay Buccaneers signed Orlovsky to a two-year-contract. On April 4, 2013, Orlovsky was cut by the Buccaneers. On April 8, 2013, four days after being cut, Orlovsky re-signed with the Buccaneers.

Detroit Lions (second stint)
On April 2, 2014, the Lions signed Orlovsky as their backup quarterback to Matthew Stafford. On March 2, 2015, the Lions re-signed Orlovsky to a one-year contract. In a game against the Cardinals, Orlovsky came in for a struggling Stafford, and threw for 191 yards, a touchdown, and an interception. 

On March 11, 2016, the Lions re-signed Orlovsky as their primary backup quarterback to Stafford.

Los Angeles Rams
On July 20, 2017, Orlovsky signed with the Los Angeles Rams. He was released by the Rams on September 2, 2017.

Retirement
Orlovsky announced his retirement from football on October 11, 2017. He joined ESPN as an analyst. On May 18, 2022, Orlovsky joined the #2 ESPN NFL crew with Steve Levy and Louis Riddick Jr., replacing Brian Griese.

Career stats

Personal life
Orlovsky is an outspoken Christian. He is married to Tiffany Orlovsky and they have four children together.

References

External links

Tampa Bay Buccaneers bio 
Indianapolis Colts bio 
Detroit Lions bio
 

1983 births
American football quarterbacks
American people of Slavic descent
American sports announcers
American Christians
College football announcers
Detroit Lions players
ESPN people
Houston Texans players
Indianapolis Colts players
Living people
Los Angeles Rams players
People from Shelton, Connecticut
Players of American football from Connecticut
Sportspeople from Bridgeport, Connecticut
Tampa Bay Buccaneers players
UConn Huskies football players
21st-century American journalists